The 1923 Maine Black Bears football team was an American football team that represented the University of Maine as a member of the New England Conference during the 1923 college football season. In its third season under head coach Fred Brice, the team compiled a 5–3 record (3–0 against conference opponents) and won the New England Conference championship.  Henry Small was the team captain.

Schedule

References

Maine
Maine Black Bears football seasons
Maine Black Bears football